Alex Davis (born January 28, 1992) is an American professional basketball player for Aomori Wat's of the Japanese B.League. After two years of college basketball at Hutchinson Community College and two years at Fresno State Davis entered the 2015 NBA draft but was not selected in the draft's two rounds.

High school career
Davis played high school basketball at Yates High School, in Houston, Texas.

College career 
During his college career, Davis attended Hutchinson Community College. With Hutchinson, he won the Region VI championship in 2013. After two years with the Blue Dragons, he was transferred to Fresno State, where he stayed until 2015.

College statistics

|-
| style="text-align:left;"| 2013–14
| style="text-align:left;"| Fresno State
| 38 ||31  ||25.0  || .482 || .250 || .590|| 3.71 ||0.68  || 0.55 || 1.89 || 5.84
|-
| style="text-align:left;"| 2014–15
| style="text-align:left;"| Fresno State
| 25 ||12  ||24.0  || .467 || .000 || .704|| 3.92 ||0.52  || 0.68 || 0.88|| 4.88
|-
|- class="sortbottom"
! style="text-align:center;" colspan=2|  Career

!63 ||43 || 24.6 ||.476  || .182 ||.629  || 3.79 ||0.62  || 0.60 ||1.49  || 5.46
|-

Professional career
After going undrafted in the 2015 NBA draft, Davis was acquired from Erie BayHawks of the NBA Development League. He spent one and a half season with the BayHawks, before being traded to the Northern Arizona Suns on January 31, 2017.

On August 21, 2019, he joined Iraklis Thessaloniki of the Greek Basket League. Davis averaged 11.2 points and 5.4 rebounds per game. On July 16, 2020, he was signed by Akita Northern Happinets of the Japanese B.League. He became the second player in Happinets history to lead the league in blocks in 2021 and 2022.

Career statistics

NBA Summer League

|-
| align="left" |2016–17
| align="left" | ORL
| 5 || 1 || 20.0 || .571 || .000 || .600 || 3.00 ||0.40 || 0.60 || 1.00 ||  5.40
|-

Regular season 

|-
| align="left" |2015–16
| align="left" | ERI
| 50 || 42 || 26.8 || .465 || .000 || .778 || 5.26 ||0.86 || 0.62 || 1.26 ||  8.64
|-
| align="left" |2016–17
| align="left" | ERI/NAS
| 51 || 39 || 24.6 || .455 || .395 || .685 || 4.84 ||0.92 || 0.65 || 1.53 ||  7.82
|-
| align="left"style="background-color:#afe6ba; border: 1px solid gray" |2017–18†
| align="left" | Beroe/Nymburk
| 50 || 9 || 18.1 || .582 || .412 || .717 || 5.12 ||0.96 || 0.66 || 1.12 ||  9.18
|-
| align="left"style="background-color:#afe6ba; border: 1px solid gray" |2018–19†
| align="left" | Nymburk
| 51 || 21 || 16.9 || .548 || .485 || .591 || 4.37 ||1.02 || 0.63 || 0.69 ||  7.96
|-
| align="left" |2019–20
| align="left" | Iraklis
| 20 || 12 || 23.7 || .621 || .500 || .606 || 5.40 ||0.80 || 0.80 || 1.35 ||  11.20
|-
| align="left" |2020–21
| align="left" | Akita
| 54 || 46 || 27.6 || .577 || .186 || .587 || 7.4 ||2.2 || 1.8 ||bgcolor="CFECEC"| 2.2* ||  11.9
|-

Awards and accomplishments

Club
Nymburk
2× National Basketball League: (2018, 2019)
2× Czech Cup: (2018, 2019)

Individual
2× B.League Blocks Leader: (2021, 2022)

References

External links
RealGM.com profile
Fresno State profile

1992 births
Living people
Akita Northern Happinets players
American expatriate basketball people in Bulgaria
American expatriate basketball people in the Czech Republic
American expatriate basketball people in Greece
American men's basketball players
Aomori Wat's players
Basketball players from Texas
Basketball Nymburk players
Erie BayHawks (2008–2017) players
Hutchinson Blue Dragons men's basketball players
Fresno State Bulldogs men's basketball players
Iraklis Thessaloniki B.C. players
Northern Arizona Suns players
Sportspeople from Texas